The following is a summary of the 2022–23 season of competitive football in Switzerland.

National teams

Men's national team

UEFA Nations League

Group 2

2022 FIFA World Cup

2022 FIFA World Cup Group G

Knockout stage

Women's national team

References

 
Seasons in Swiss football